Sarah Thomson  may refer to:
Sarah Thomson (actress), with roles in Power Rangers and Shortland Street
Sarah Thomson (publisher), publisher of Women's Post magazine and a 2010 mayoral candidate in Toronto

See also
Sarah Thompson (disambiguation)